Let Me Go may refer to:

Songs 
 "Let Me Go" (3 Doors Down song), 2005
 "Let Me Go" (Avril Lavigne song), 2013
 "Let Me Go" (Cake song), 1998
 "Let Me Go" (Daniel Caesar song), 2023
 "Let Me Go" (Gary Barlow song), 2013
 "Let Me Go" (Hailee Steinfeld and Alesso song), 2017
 "Let Me Go" (Heaven 17 song), 1982
 "Let Me Go" (Maverick Sabre song), 2011
 "Let Me Go", by Good Charlotte from Good Charlotte, 2000
 "Let Me Go", by Jolin Tsai from Lucky Number, 2001
 "Let Me Go", by Marvelous 3 from Hey! Album, 1998
 "Let Me Go", by Melissa Etheridge from Brave and Crazy, 1989
 "Let Me Go", by Rancid from Rancid, 2000
 "Let Me Go", by The Rolling Stones from Emotional Rescue, 1980
 "Let Me Go", by Scott Stapp from The Great Divide, 2005
 "Let Me Go", by Three Dog Night from Three Dog Night, 1968

See also 
 "Let Me Go, Devil", a song written by Jenny Lou Carson and recorded by Georgie Shaw
 Let Me Go, Let Me Go, Let Me Go, an album by Jason Molina
 "Let Me Go, Lover!", a popular song adapted from "Let Me Go, Devil" and first recorded by Joan Weber, recorded by many artists
 Let Go (disambiguation)
 Let It Go (disambiguation)